Proprioseiopsis bordjelaini is a species of mite in the family Phytoseiidae.

References

bordjelaini
Articles created by Qbugbot
Animals described in 1966